Robert H. Waterman Jr. (November 11, 1936 - January 2, 2022) was a non-fiction author and expert on business management practices.

He was best known as the co-author, with Tom Peters, of In Search of Excellence. Waterman later directed his own company, The Waterman Group, Inc., after 21 years at the management consulting firm McKinsey & Company.

In Search of Excellence was published in 1982 and became a bestseller, gaining national exposure when a series of television specials based on the book and hosted by Waterman and Peters appeared on PBS. The primary idea espoused was that of solving business problems with as little business process overhead as possible, and empowering decision-makers at multiple levels of a company.

He is also the author of: 
The Renewal Factor
Adhocracy: the Power to Change
What America Does Right (Frontiers of Excellence in Europe and UK).

Career
He earned his bachelor's in geophysics from the Colorado School of Mines in 1958, and  MBA from Stanford University in 1961. From 1963 until 1985 Waterman worked for the management consulting firm McKinsey & Company becoming a Director in 1976. Later he served as a Founding Director of the electric power firm, AES.

Personal life
Waterman served as chair of the RLS Foundation, the national non-profit organization that sponsors research, raises awareness of, and looks for better treatments for Restless leg syndrome. He also served on the boards of the World Wildlife Fund, Scleroderma Research Foundation, US Ski Team, ASK Group, Boise Cascade, the AES Corporation, and McKesson.

He died on January 2, 2022, in Palo Alto, California, at age 85.

References

Living people
American business theorists
American non-fiction writers
Stanford Graduate School of Business alumni
Colorado School of Mines alumni
American financial businesspeople
1936 births